Typhlomangelia lincta is a species of sea snail, a marine gastropod mollusk in the family Borsoniidae.

Description
The shell grows to a length of 12 mm.

Distribution
This marine species occurs off Puerto Rico and the Virgin Islands.

References

 Watson R.B. 1881. Mollusca of H.M.S. 'Challenger' expedition -part 9. Journal of the Linnean Society, 15: 413–455.

External links
   Bouchet P., Kantor Yu.I., Sysoev A. & Puillandre N. (2011) A new operational classification of the Conoidea. Journal of Molluscan Studies 77: 273-308.

lincta
Gastropods described in 1881